Burris is a surname, and may refer to:

 Al Burris (1894–1938), baseball player
 Art Burris (1924–1993) basketball player
 Benjamin J. Burris, university president
 Bo Burris (born 1944), American football player
 Buddy Burris (1923–2007) football player 
 Henry Burris (born 1975), football player
 Jack Burris (1917–1952), attorney and murder victim
 Jeff Burris (born 1972), football player
 John Burris (born 1945), attorney
 John Burris (politician) (born 1986), American politician
 Kurt Burris (1932–1999), football player
 Patrick Burris (born 1950), martial artist
 Patrick Tracy Burris (1967–2009), American spree killer
 Ray Burris (born 1950), baseball player
 Robert H. Burris (1914–2010), biochemistry professor
 Roland Burris (born 1937), politician and US Senator from Illinois
 Samuel Burris (1808–1869), abolitionist
 Timothy Burris, lutenist
 Tony Burris (American football), American football player
 Tony K. Burris, (1929–1951) soldier

See also
 Burress
 Burri
 Burriss
 Burris Laboratory School
 Burris Nunatak
 Roland Burris Burial Site